Tatiana Segura is an American biomedical engineer who is a professor at Duke University. Her research considers biomedical engineering solutions to promote cell growth. She was elected Fellow of the American Institute for Medical and Biological Engineering in 2017 and awarded the Acta Biomaterialia Silver Medal in 2021.

Early life and education 
Segura earned her undergraduate degree at the University of California, Berkeley. She moved to Northwestern University for her doctoral research, where she used hydrogel scaffolds for non-viral gene delivery with Lonnie Shea. Segura moved to the École Polytechnique Fédérale de Lausanne working alongside Jeffrey Hubbell on polymer self-assembly.

Research and career 
Segura joined University of California, Los Angeles in 2007. She moved to the Duke University Pratt School of Engineering in 2018. Segura studies new materials for in situ tissue repair. Her research focuses on the development of hydrogels that can help the body repair damaged or diseased tissue. These gels can help the repair by forming a scafold in the wound that acts like an extracellular matrix, encouraging tissue growth. By integrating an integrin-binding molecule, the blood vessels that form within this new tissue are stronger. These hydrogels can harness the body's innate immune response, promoting endogenous (and rapid) tissue repair. In particular, Segura considers the growth of new neurons and new blood vessels to enable healing in the brain and the skin. New neurons could limit the impact of conditions such as strokes, and in the skin, new blood vessels promote sebaceous gland growth, minimizing scarring.

Segura created coatings for orthopaedic implants that contained antibiotics, which can eliminate infectious bacteria and transform surgical implants.

Awards and honors 
 American Society of Gene and Cell Therapy Outstanding Young Investigator Award
 American Heart Association National Scientist Development Grant
 National Science Foundation CAREER Award 
 Elected to the College of Fellows at the American Institute for Medical and Biological Engineers
 Acta Biomaterialia Silver Medal Award

Selected publications

References 

Living people
Year of birth missing (living people)
American biomedical engineers
American women engineers
21st-century American engineers
21st-century women engineers
University of California, Berkeley alumni
Northwestern University alumni
École Polytechnique Fédérale de Lausanne alumni
University of California, Los Angeles people
Duke University faculty
Fellows of the American Institute for Medical and Biological Engineering